Stuart Kirby (born May 9, 1981) is an American stock car racing driver. He has driven in ARCA, the Busch Series, and the NEXTEL Cup Series. A former apprentice funeral director for his family's funeral home, he drove the No. 51 Chevrolet owned by Competitive Edge Motorsports in 2005, but was released before the season could be concluded. He previously owned a Bruster's Ice Cream franchise in Bowling Green, KY while still pursuing a career in racing, but now works as a realtor for Sotheby's International Realty in Inlet Beach, Florida.

Racing career
On October 7, 2001, Kirby made his Winston Cup Series debut at the UAW-GM Quality 500.  Kirby was taken out early in a crash involving Todd Bodine and Ricky Craven.  He raced for Jimmy Spencer in Busch and Trucks, and had a lot of success in ARCA Racing, where he got his first career pole driving a car with the American Boy Scouts logo.

In late 2005, Kirby was featured alongside his wife in MTV's "The Reality Show" during a segment titled, "'Til Death Do Us Part". As of then, Kirby was assisting his family as a funeral director in their funeral home. The show never even mentioned Kirby's racing career.

On August 28, 2009, Kirby made a comeback in his racing career after almost 4 years. He raced in the ARCA RE/MAX Series race, qualifying 12th and finished in 11th place.

Motorsports career results

NASCAR
(key) (Bold – Pole position awarded by qualifying time. Italics – Pole position earned by points standings or practice time. * – Most laps led.)

Nextel Cup Series

Busch Series

Craftsman Truck Series

ARCA Re/Max Series
(key) (Bold – Pole position awarded by qualifying time. Italics – Pole position earned by points standings or practice time. * – Most laps led.)

References

External links

1981 births
Living people
ARCA Menards Series drivers
NASCAR drivers
Racing drivers from Kentucky